Muniz or Muñiz is a surname, primarily in the Spanish language, where it is spelled Muñiz (Muniz is an American or Portuguese variant). It may refer to:

 Aned Y. Muñiz Gracia, a professor
 Carlos Muñiz (born 1981), a baseball player
 Frankie Muniz (born 1985), an American actor
 Júlio César de Paula Muniz Júnior (born 1988), a Brazilian football player
 Manny Muñiz (born 1947), a Puerto Rican baseball player
 Marco Antonio Muñiz (born 1933), a Mexican singer
 Marc Anthony (born 1968), a Puerto Rican singer (born Marco Antonio Muñiz)
 Rafo Muñiz (born 1956), a Puerto Rican actor, director, & producer
 Tomás Muñiz (1900-1965), a Puerto Rican radio and television producer
 Tommy Muñiz (1922-2009), a Puerto Rican comedian
 Vik Muniz (born 1961), an avant-garde artist

See also 
 Moniz
 Muñoz

Spanish-language surnames